Joseph or Joe Wade may refer to:

Joseph Augustine Wade (1796–1845), Irish composer
Joseph Marshall Wade (1832–1905), British-American publisher
Joe Wade (filmmaker), British filmmaker, TV writer and producer
Joe Wade (footballer) (1921–2005), British footballer and manager
Joe Wade (trade unionist) (1919–2004), British trade union leader

See also

 Josephine Wade, American businesswoman and restaurant owner